WBCB is an AM broadcast station licensed to operate on 1490  kHz for Levittown, Pennsylvania, and serving the areas of Bucks County, Pennsylvania and other parts of suburban Philadelphia.  Its programming mixes news, talk, music and local sports.

WBCB began broadcasting on December 8, 1957 by owner Drew J.T. O'Keefe, who was a Main Line attorney. He owned the station until his death in the late 1980s. The early years were marked by the emergence of soon to be big name personalities like Bill Bircher and Horace Greely McNabb. Since 1992, the station has been owned by local businessman Pasquale T. Deon Jr. and veteran Philadelphia Eagles broadcaster Merrill Reese, who was a WBCB alumnus early in his career.

Current personalities
 Merrill Reese
 Dan Baker
 Greg Luzinski
 Dennis Ostopowicz
 Ted Efaw, Program Director
 Chris Ermer
 Jim Foxwell, Mornings
 Fearon Derry
 Pat Wandling, Speak Your Piece
 Lou Powers
 Joe LeCompte
 Brooks Saint Ives
 Jack Speers
 Billy Werndl
 Paul Jolovitz 
 Keith Noonan

Alumni personalities
Vince Reed, News, for over 40 years.

Bruce Bailey, ca. 1971 evening shift from 7p.m.-Midnight

Jerry Angert, 1989–1991, GM, PD, Morning Host

Steve Bessler, Morning Drive, 1980s

Bill Tourot, Overnight DJ, 1982

Tom Richards, Overnight fill-in, 1982

Jim Costanzo, Overnight fill-in, 1982

Paul Baroli Jr, Program Manager, Coffee With Kahuna, for 10 years.

Dick Fennessy (Tom Sommers) 1972-1974 Afternoons/Evenings

John Brown Evenings and Afternoons 1970s

Dan Wing - News Anchor/Sports Director/DJ - 2007-2014

Bill Matter, afternoon drive fill-in, 1979

Al Stewart (Allan Hotlen) Nights

"Quick" Karl Rahmer 6p.m.-Midnight

Charles A. Hidalgo, On Air Talent, 1984 to 1994

Jim Glogowski - Jimmy G, 1970's and 1980's

Speciality shows
 Monday Night Kickoff
 Pro Football Report with Merrill Reese 
 The Bull Session with Dan Baker and Greg "The Bull" Luzinski
 Baseball Insiders with John Brazer and Ricky Bottalico
 Bill Clement's Hockey World
 Pro Wrestling Weekly with Fearon Derry
 Chart Toppers with Fearon Derry
 Racing Wrap With Skip Clayton
 The Dennis Ostopowicz Polka Show
 Sunshine Music Memories with Smilin' Lou Powers
 Jolly and the Loon

External links

Full service radio stations in the United States
Radio stations established in 1957
BCB